= W. D. Hudson =

British philosopher (1920–2003)

William Donald Hudson, who published as W. D. Hudson (1920 – 1 November 2003) was an English Baptist minister and philosopher. He wrote on ethics, philosophy of religion, and the philosophy of Wittgenstein.
